Visarion Saraj  also known as Visarion Sarai (1714–1744)
was an Orthodox cleric who was targeted by members of the Habsburg Dynasty for speaking his mind which led to him being imprisoned in Deva and then sent to a jail in Timișoara 
and from there to Sankt Ruprecht an der Raab before being tortured to death in the dungeon of the Kufstein Fortress in the Kaiser Mountains of the city of Tyrol. Because of this, the Holy Synods of the Romanian Orthodox Church and the Serbian Orthodox Church introduced Vissarion in the calendar of their Saints.

See also
 List of Serbian saints

References 

1717 births
1744 deaths